Adolph John may refer to:

 Adolph John I, Count Palatine of Kleeburg (1629–1689)
 Adolph John II, Count Palatine of Kleeburg (1666–1701)